Okocim  is a village in Brzesko County, Lesser Poland Voivodeship, Poland.

Since Polish administrative reorganization in 1999, Okocim is a part of Lesser Poland Voivodeship. Before the reorganization it was part of Tarnów Voivodeship (1975–1998).

See also
Okocim Brewery

External link

Villages in Brzesko County